SPST may refer to:

 Saint Paul School of Theology, a school of higher learning in Kansas City, Missouri, United States
 Cad. FAP Guillermo del Castillo Paredes Airport's ICAO code
 Single pole, single throw, a type of electrical switch